Secret Weapons of the Luftwaffe is a World War II air-combat combat flight simulation game first released in August 1991 by Lucasfilm Games.

It was the last of a trilogy of World War II titles by Lucasfilm Games, the others being Battlehawks 1942 (1988) and Their Finest Hour (1989). It enabled the player to fly aircraft of the USAAF Eighth Air Force and the German Luftwaffe, including some experimental aircraft that did not see operational service during World War II.

The game was initially released with a code wheel and a 225-page manual, detailing the air war over Western Europe between 1943 and 1945. The game also featured a campaign mode, similar to that found in Their Finest Hour, where the player had to make the strategic decisions on which targets were to be attacked (as USAAF 8th Air Force) or defended (by the German Luftwaffe).

Four expansion packs were released: P-38 Lightning (1991), P-80 Shooting Star (1991), Do 335 Pfeil (1992) and He 162 Volksjäger (1992).

Setting
The game focuses battles between the Eighth Air Force and the Luftwaffe challenge during World War II, especially the American strategic bombing offensive against Germany, from August 1943 towards the end of war in 1945. It is focused more on action than on realistic simulation. The game sets up German secret weapons, with fast jet propulsion and a variety of missiles and bombs, against slower but more numerous American piston-engined airplanes.

There are a number of ways into the game, covering full Tours of Duty, historical missions, campaign battles as well as a custom mission builder.

Tours of Duty
In Tours of Duty, the player creates his own pilot (or crew, for B-17 Flying Fortress) and fights in the air war for a limited number of missions (from 25 to 55, according to the historical Squadrons). The pilot/crew gain experience points, ranks and decorations; and if he manages to survive his assigned Tours of Duty, he can even start another, without time limitations. The same Pilot/Crew can be deployed by the Player in Campaign Battles, or in Historical Missions or Custom Missions.

Historical Missions
The game features a numerous set of prebuilt, historically-oriented missions in which the player is free to choose their own pilot and/or crew.

Mission Builder
The Mission Builder allows the user to create missions. The "Waves" function allows the player to automatically replicate, up to 9 times, any planned non-bombing Flight; so that it is possible to simulate, for example, several waves of enemy interceptors against a Bomber formation, planning a single Flight of interceptors and setting the "Waves" option as desired.

Campaign Battles

Campaign Battles are the heart of SWOTL, allowing the Player to plan missions inside the Campaign Battles, using the Mission builder. This feature allows the player plan their own way to fight the air war, without any limitations. Success or defeat are determined by several overall Winning/Losing conditions.

Reception
Computer Gaming World in 1991 and 1993 gave the game four and a half stars out of five, stating that it "is a welcome addition to Lucasfilm's World War II aerial oeuvre. Graphically rich, stylistically complex and user-accessible, it succeeds on three levels (tactical, operational and strategic)". The magazine gave the expansion disks four stars. In 1992 the magazine named it one of the year's best simulation games.

References

External links
 

1991 video games
DOS games
LucasArts games
Classic Mac OS games
U.S. Gold games
Video games developed in the United States
Video games scored by Michael Land
Video games with expansion packs
World War II flight simulation video games
Single-player video games